Fritz Koelle (10 March 1895, Augsburg — 4 August 1953, Probstzella) was a German sculptor.

Further reading 
 Claus Pese: Mehr als nur Kunst. Das Archiv für Bildende Kunst im Germanischen Nationalmuseum, Ostfildern-Ruit 1998 (Kulturgeschichtliche Spaziergänge im Germanischen Nationalmuseum, v. 2), pp. 63–66, 83.
 Eva-M. Pasche: Fritz Koelle - der Gestalter des Arbeiters - Monographie und Werkverzeichnis. Essen: Verlag Glückauf 2001, 
 Monika Maier-Speicher / Dieter Wirth: "Fritz Koelle und der Bergmann von der Saar", Exhibition catalog. St. Ingbert 2003, 44 pages,

External links 
 
 
 Entry for Fritz Koelle in the Union List of Artist Names
 Website with further information and photos of his work.
 Timeline of life and work from the Deutsches Historischen Museum

German male sculptors
1895 births
1953 deaths
20th-century sculptors
Artists from Augsburg